Tetragonoderus subfasciatus is a species of beetle in the family Carabidae. It was described by Jules Putzeys in 1846.

References

Beetles described in 1846
subfasciatus